Lift Every Voice and Sing is an album by American jazz drummer Max Roach with the J.C. White Singers recorded in 1971 and released on the Atlantic label.

Reception

Allmusic awarded the album 4 stars and its review by Vincent Thomas states, "Few albums exhibit the church's lasting effect on his musical direction more than Lift Every Voice and Sing. It's deeper than the album title... it's the Elvin Jones/John Coltrane-esque interplay between Roach and Harper on "Joshua" that makes this album unforgettable—every time the choir comes in, the emotion is enough to crumble the Wall of Jericho".

Track listing
 "Motherless Child" (Traditional) - 7:21     
 "Garden of Prayer" (Patricia Curtis, Max Roach) - 2:47     
 "Troubled Waters" (Traditional) - 7:00     
 "Let Thy People Go" (Traditional) - 6:50     
 "Were You There When They Crucified My Lord" (Traditional) - 5:48     
 "Joshua" (Traditional) - 7:12  
Recorded in New York on April 7, 1971 (tracks 1 & 3-5), and April 8, 1971 (tracks 2 & 6)

Personnel 
Max Roach - drums, arranger
Cecil Bridgewater - trumpet 
Billy Harper - tenor saxophone 
George Cables - piano 
Eddie Mathias  - electric bass
Ralph MacDonald - percussion
Ruby McClure, Dorothy White, J.C. White - vocals
Unidentified 22 voice choir 
William Bell, Abbey Lincoln, Coleridge-Taylor Perkinson - arranger

References 

1971 albums
Max Roach albums
Atlantic Records albums
Albums produced by Joel Dorn